The following lists events during 1992 in British Hong Kong.

Incumbents
 Monarch of the United Kingdom - Elizabeth II
 Governor - Chris Patten
 Chief Secretary - Sir David Ford

Events
United States-Hong Kong Policy Act is formulated.

Births
6 August - Tara Moore, tennis player

See also
List of Hong Kong films of 1992

References

 
Years of the 20th century in Hong Kong
Hong Kong
Hong Kong
1992 in British Overseas Territories